Naya Dunia was a weekly newspaper published from Sylhet, India. It was an organ of the Communist Party of India. Jyotirmoy Nandy was the editor of the newspaper as of the late 1930s.

References

Communist newspapers
Communist Party of India
Defunct newspapers published in India
Defunct weekly newspapers
Publications with year of establishment missing
Publications with year of disestablishment missing
Sylhet
Weekly newspapers published in India